Roy Henzell Oval is a cricket ground in Caloundra, Queensland, Australia.  The first recorded match on the ground came in 1981 when Queensland Country played the touring West Indians.  It held its only first-class match in 1993 when Queensland played the touring England A side, with the match ending in a draw.  Three Youth One Day Internationals were played there in 2007 between Australia Under-19s and Pakistan Under-19.

See also

List of sports venues named after individuals

References

External links
Roy Henzell Oval at ESPNcricinfo
Roy Henzell Oval at CricketArchive

Cricket grounds in Queensland
Sport in the Sunshine Coast, Queensland
Sports venues completed in 1981